Around the World in 80 Days is a 2004 American action adventure comedy film based on Jules Verne's 1873 novel of the same name and remake of the movie of the same name of 1956. It stars Jackie Chan, Steve Coogan and Cécile de France. The film is set in the nineteenth century and centers on Phileas Fogg (Coogan), here reimagined as an eccentric inventor, and his efforts to circumnavigate the globe in 80 days. During the trip, he is accompanied by his Chinese valet, Passepartout (Chan). For comedic reasons, the film intentionally deviated wildly from the novel and included a number of anachronistic elements. With production costs of about $110 million and estimated marketing costs of $30 million, it earned $24 million at the U.S. box office and $48 million worldwide, making it a box office failure.

Plot

Lau Xing robs the Bank of England and hides in Phileas Fogg's house, giving his name as "Passport...too". Fogg hears "Passepartout" and hires him as valet. Passepartout helps Fogg break the  speed barrier. At the Royal Academy of Science, Fogg is insulted by Baron Kelvin. Fogg bets that he can travel around the world in 80 days. If he wins, he will replace Kelvin as Minister of Science. If not, he will be ruined. Fogg and Passepartout take a carriage out of London after a confrontation with corrupt Inspector Fix, hired by Kelvin.

Passepartout and Fogg journey to Paris, where Passepartout must evade General Fang's warriors. Fang wants the jade Buddha previously given to Lord Kelvin but stolen by Passepartout. Pretending to take Fogg to see Thomas Edison, Passepartout leads him to impressionist painting student Monique La Roche. Passepartout fights the warriors while his boss discusses impressionism. The two men and Monique depart in a hot-air balloon, chased by Fang's warriors.

The trio continue their journey by train. However, in Istanbul, they are forced to become guests of Prince Hapi's banquet. Whilst initially hospitable, he soon orders the men to leave while Monique must become his seventh wife. The men convince Hapi to release Monique or they will damage his personal statue of "The Thinker", which is accidentally smashed. With Hapi in pursuit, the three travelers then escape.

Kelvin learns about the bank robbery. He orders the British-colonial authorities in India to arrest both men. Passepartout sees notice of the price on his head and warns his companions. Disguised as women they are attacked by Fang's warriors. Using Inspector Fix and a sextant as weapons, Fogg and Passepartout defeat their assailants and flee to China.

In a Chinese village where Lau Xing had came from, Lanzhou, they are welcomed by Lau's family members. However, they are captured by the Black Scorpions. Recognized, Lau Xing challenges the leader of the group to a fight. At first, he fights alone and is defeated; moments later, he is joined by his fellow "Ten Tigers of Canton" to defeat the Black Scorpions. The jade Buddha is returned to the village temple.

Fogg desires to continue alone, disappointed and feeling used by his companions after finding out that through a picture of Lau and his family members in the village. He travels to San Francisco and is tricked out of his money. He is found destitute by Lau Xing and Monique who have followed him. In the Western desert, they find the Wright brothers who discuss their prototype flying machine. Fogg suggests a few changes, which are eagerly taken.

In New York City, a jubilant crowd prevents them from their ship. A policeman leads them to an ambush in a workshop. The three friends fight Fang and her warriors and win. Though Fogg could have gotten to the boat, he misses it to help Lau Xing. Fogg feels that he has lost, but the other two say that they may still make it if they catch the next ship.

They board an old ship and Fogg builds a plane out of the ship's old wood, promising a new ship to the captain. The ship's crew builds a catapult to launch it. The three fly to London and crash-land at the Royal Academy. Kelvin sends police to hinder them, and the clock strikes noon, ending the wager.

Kelvin proclaims himself the victor. Monique, Fix and other ministers attest to Kelvin's unfair methods. Kelvin insults Queen Victoria who overhears the insult which leads to Kelvin’s arrest. She then reveals that she has bet money on Fogg winning and congratulates him for making it back a day early. Though Lau and Monique are confused, Fogg eventually realizes that they forgot to take the International Date Line into account: they themselves experienced 80 days, but London only experienced 79 days. He ascends the stairs of the Academy and kisses Monique, victorious in his bet.

Cast

Johnny Knoxville was initially cast as San Francisco Hobo.

Production
Warner Bros., who owned the rights to the 1956 adaptation, planned their own remake with Stephen Sommers directing and Brendan Fraser starring, after the success of The Mummy. Stan Chervin wrote the script for this utilization of the film. Around the same time, 20th Century Fox and Good Machine were developing their own version with Mark Rosenthal and Lawrence Konner writing the screenplay. Ang Lee and Stephen Herek were considered to direct.

When Frank Coraci got involved, he went back to read the original novel and watch the 1956 film, where he realized that the story didn't really have a driving lead character. So he decided to rework the plot considerably, which involved giving Phileas Fogg an arc. Coraci's first choice for Fogg was Johnny Depp, but studio executives at the time didn't think Depp in a family movie would ever work (this was before the release of Pirates of the Caribbean: The Curse of the Black Pearl). Jackie Chan was announced to play Passepartout in June 2002. He was paid about $18 million for the role. After Chan was cast, the filmmakers settled on lesser known character actor Steve Coogan for Fogg. Walden Media was in charge of investing the film while Summit Entertainment handled foreign sales. Paramount Pictures acquired domestic distribution rights, and set a release date for November 21, 2003. However, the studio stepped out at the start of the year, with concerns over the high budget and bankability of the cast.

Principal photography began on March 13, 2003 in Thailand, followed by a 3-month shoot at Babelsberg Studio in Berlin. Before Disney had picked the film up for distribution, it was one of the highest-budget films produced without a distributor attached.

Music

Soundtrack
 "It's Slinky!" – Written by Homer Fesperman and Charles Weasley
 "Sehnaz Pesrev
 "The Mystery Continues" – Composed by Suma Ograda
 "Everybody, All over the World (Join the Celebration)" – Performed by David A. Stewart and Sylvia Young Stage School
 "River of Dreams" (Instrumental) – Written by David A. Stewart and Aidan Love
 "It's a Small World" – Written by the Sherman Brothers, and performed by Baha Men

Release

Around the World in 80 Days premiered at the El Capitan Theatre in Hollywood, California on June 13, 2004 and was released in theaters on June 16, 2004 by Walt Disney Pictures. It was also released on DVD and VHS on November 2, 2004 by Walt Disney Home Entertainment.

Reception

Critical response

Around the World in 80 Days was met with mixed reviews. Rotten Tomatoes gives the film a 32% approval rating, based on 128 reviews, with an average score of 4.79/10, with the site's consensus stating: "Hit-and-miss family fare that bears only the slightest resemblance to Verne's novel." Metacritic gives the film a weighted score of 49 out of 100, based on reviews from 33 critics, indicating "mixed or average reviews". Audiences polled by CinemaScore gave the film an average grade of "B+" on an A+ to F scale.

The Guardian critic Rob Mackie, criticized it for having little to no resemblance to the novel it is based on. Roger Ebert praised it for its visual style and for being "goofy fun". Todd McCarthy of Variety wrote: "Takes plenty of liberties with the material and never generates much genuine excitement, but provides an agreeable ride without overloading it with contemporary filmmaking mannerisms."
In 2014, the Los Angeles Times listed the film as one of the most expensive box office flops of all time.

Accolades
The film was nominated for two Razzie Awards - Worst Remake or Sequel and Worst Supporting Actor (Arnold Schwarzenegger).

See also
 List of American films of 2004
 Around the World in 80 Days (1956 film)
 Around the World in Eighty Days (book)
 Jackie Chan filmography
 Arnold Schwarzenegger filmography
 Around the World in 80 Days (2004)

References

External links

 
 

2004 films
2000s adventure comedy films
American action adventure films
American children's adventure films
2004
Films directed by Frank Coraci
Walt Disney Pictures films
Walden Media films
Babelsberg Studio films
Steampunk films
Films set in 1890
Films set in China
Films set in Germany
Films set in Istanbul
Films set in London
Films set in New Mexico
Films set in New York City
Films set in Paris
Films set in San Francisco
Films set in the Atlantic Ocean
Films set in India
Films set in the British Raj
Films set on the Orient Express
Films scored by Trevor Jones
Cultural depictions of Queen Victoria on film
Cultural depictions of the Wright brothers
Cultural depictions of Herbert Kitchener, 1st Earl Kitchener
2000s chase films
Cultural depictions of Vincent van Gogh
2004 comedy films
2000s English-language films
2000s American films